Miloslava Rezková (22 July 1950 – 19 October 2014), also known as Miloslava Hübnerová, was a Czech high jumper who won gold medals at the 1968 Olympics and 1969 European Championships.

Rezková was born and raised in Prague, where she married Rudolf Hübner, a fellow Olympic high jumper. She first trained in ballet and rhythmic gymnastics before changing to the high jump. In 1968 she improved her personal best from 1.66 to 1.87 m, and became national and Olympic champion. In the high jump world ranking she was first in 1968 and 1969, sixth in 1970–71, and ninth in 1972–73. She retired after 1977 and later became a goldsmith and athletics coach.

References

External links
 
 
 

1950 births
2014 deaths
Athletes from Prague
Czech female high jumpers
Czechoslovak female high jumpers
Olympic athletes of Czechoslovakia
Olympic gold medalists for Czechoslovakia
Athletes (track and field) at the 1968 Summer Olympics
Athletes (track and field) at the 1972 Summer Olympics
European Athletics Championships medalists
Medalists at the 1968 Summer Olympics
Olympic gold medalists in athletics (track and field)